Hörnli mountain is located on the territory of the community of Fischenthal, in the  Zürcher Oberland, in the eastern part of canton of Zürich, in Switzerland.

North of the Hörnli, the Dreiländerstein, altitude , marks the meeting of the boundaries of the three Cantons of Zürich, St.Gallen and Thurgau.

Already in the Middle Ages, the so-called Schwabenweg, led over the Hörnli, as a part of the Way of St. James. Since 2008, it is an integrated stretch of the Kreuzlingen branch on the Via Jacobi, registered on the official Swiss national trekking path nr. 4, signalled as leg Fischingen–Rapperswil on Wanderland Schweiz.

Climate

See also
Way of St. James (route descriptions)
Way of St. James
St. James
Swiss plateau

References

:de:Hörnli (Berg)

External links

 Berggasthaus Hörnli
 Description of the leg of ViaJacobi at "Wanderland Schweiz"
 Hörnli Tourenberichte und Fotos
 Fotos und Aussicht vom Hörnli

Mountains of Switzerland
Mountains of the canton of Zürich
St. Gallen–Thurgau border
St. Gallen–Zürich border
Thurgau–Zürich border